Dennis Jose Del Valle Villalobos (born 27 January 1989) is a Puerto Rican male volleyball player. He was part of the Puerto Rico men's national volleyball team at the 2014 FIVB Volleyball Men's World Championship in Poland. He played for Mets de Guaynabo.

Personal life
Del Valle came out as gay in May 2020 “in hopes that it will inspire other queer athletes to do the same”.

Clubs
 Mets de Guaynabo (2014)

References

External links
 Dennis Del Valle at the International Volleyball Federation
 
 Dennis Jose del Valle Villalobos at WorldofVolley

1989 births
Living people
Puerto Rican men's volleyball players
Place of birth missing (living people)
Gay sportsmen
Puerto Rican LGBT sportspeople
LGBT volleyball players
21st-century LGBT people
Penn State Nittany Lions men's volleyball players